The cerulean-capped manakin (Lepidothrix coeruleocapilla) is a species of bird in the family Pipridae.
It is endemic to Peru.

Its natural habitat is subtropical or tropical moist montane forest.

References

cerulean-capped manakin
Birds of the Peruvian Andes
Endemic birds of Peru
cerulean-capped manakin
Taxonomy articles created by Polbot